William Howard Greene (1895–1956) was an American cinematographer.

Career
Greene was a cinematographer on many early Technicolor films, including Legong: Dance of the Virgins (1935) and A Star Is Born (1937).

Awards
 1937: Special Academy Award (with Harold Rosson) for color cinematography, The Garden of Allah (1936)
 1938: Special Academy Award for color cinematography, A Star Is Born (1937)
 1944: Academy Award for Best Cinematography, Color, Phantom of the Opera (1943)

References

External links
 
 
 

1895 births
1956 deaths
American cinematographers
Academy Honorary Award recipients
Best Cinematographer Academy Award winners